Dzyarzhynsk District is one of the districts of Belarus, located in Minsk Region, Belarus. The administrative center of the district is Dzyarzhynsk. In Dzyarzhynsk Raion (Dzerzhinsky district) the highest point of Belarus is situated. It is 345 meters above level sea called Dzerzhinskaya mountain or Dzyarzhynskaya Hara.

See also

Cities 
Dzyarzhynsk
Fanipol

Urban-type settlements 
 Negoreloe

Notable residents 
 Emeryk Hutten-Czapski (1828–1896), scholar, ardent historical collector and numismatist
 Karol Hutten-Czapski (1860-1904), businessman and philanthropist, Mayor of Minsk between 1890 and 1901
 Mikałaj Ułaščyk (1906, Vickaǔščyna village – 1986), Belarusian historian and archaeologist specialising in medieval history, a Gulag prisoner
 Mikola Yermalovich (1921, Malyja Navasiolki – 2000) was a Belarusian writer and historian
 Mother of Sergei Glushko, Russian actor, singer and fitness model

References

External links

 
Districts of Minsk Region